Flint Rock Creek is a stream in the U.S. state of South Dakota.

Flint Rock Creek was so named on account of the flint rock formations near it.

See also
List of rivers of South Dakota

References

Rivers of Meade County, South Dakota
Rivers of Perkins County, South Dakota
Rivers of Ziebach County, South Dakota
Rivers of South Dakota